Roger Gilson (19 September 1947 – 18 January 1995) was a Luxembourgian cyclist. He competed in the individual road race at the 1968 Summer Olympics.

Major results

1964
 1st  Overall Grand Prix Général Patton
1965
 1st  Road race, National Junior Road Championships
1966
 1st Stage 2 Grand Prix François Faber
1967
 1st  Overall Flèche du Sud
1st Stage 2
 2nd Overall Grand Prix François Faber
1968
 3rd Overall Flèche du Sud
 9th Overall Tour de l'Avenir
1969
 1st  Overall Flèche du Sud
 2nd Road race, National Road Championships
 4th Overall Tour de Luxembourg
1970
 1st Stage 1 Route de France
 9th Overall Tour de Luxembourg
1972
 1st  Road race, National Road Championships
 8th Overall Tour du Nord
1973
 2nd Road race, National Road Championships
 6th Overall Tour de Luxembourg
 7th Rund um den Henninger Turm
 8th Züri-Metzgete
1974
 1st  Road race, National Road Championships
1975
 1st  Road race, National Road Championships
 6th Overall Tour de Luxembourg
1976
 1st  Road race, National Road Championships
 1st Stage 2 Vuelta a España
 10th Overall Tour de Luxembourg
1977
 3rd Overall Tour d'Indre-et-Loire

References

External links
 

1947 births
1995 deaths
Luxembourgian male cyclists
Luxembourgian Vuelta a España stage winners
Olympic cyclists of Luxembourg
Cyclists at the 1968 Summer Olympics
People from Dudelange